Rent Control is a comedy-drama/romance film starring Brent Spiner and directed by Gian Luigi Polidoro. The film was made in 1982 but was not released until 1984.

Plot
Leonard Junger tries to find a rent-controlled New York City apartment, and to interest various women.

Cast
 Brent Spiner as Leonard Junger
 Elizabeth Stack as Anne
 Roy Brocksmith as Stan
 Jeanne Ruskin as Margaret
 Leonard Melfi as Milton Goeller
 Annie Korzen as Nancy Junger
 Charles Laiken as Jim
 Kimberly Stern as Jeannie
 Leslie Cifarelli as Barbara

References

External links

1984 films
1980s English-language films
Films directed by Gian Luigi Polidoro
1984 comedy-drama films
Rent regulation
American comedy-drama films
Regulation in the United States
1984 comedy films
1984 drama films
1980s American films